Emilio García Riera  (born 17 November 1931 in Ibiza, Spain – died on 11 October 2002 in Zapopan, Jalisco, Mexico) was an actor, writer and cinema critic. He has written exhaustively on Mexican cinema of 1929 and 1976, leaving behind an anthology in eighteen volumes, Historia documental del cine mexicano.

After the Spanish Civil War he moved first to France, then to the Dominican Republic, where his father died, and in 1944 arrived in Mexico, which became his adopted country. He worked in the Economics faculty of the National Autonymous University of Mexico, as a researcher in the Centre of Communication, as a professor of the sociology of cinema in the faculty of Social and Political Sciences, and as a professor in his alma mater's University Centre for Cinematography Studies. He later moved to the city of Guadalajara, where he was the founder and director of the Centre of Cinematography Research and Teaching at the University of Guadalajara, which posthumously awarded him an honorary doctorate.

References

1931 births
2002 deaths
20th-century Mexican writers
20th-century Mexican male writers
People from Ibiza